The Duke-UNC China Leadership Summit (CLS) is an annual student conference that brings together distinguished student leaders and eminent individuals in the fields of academia, politics and business to examine the rise of China.

Inspired by student conferences like The Harvard Project for Asian and International Relations and the Forum for American/Chinese Exchange at Stanford, CLS is the first conference of its kind in the southern United States. Established in 2010 with the goal of providing sustained collaboration between students and faculty at Duke University and the University of North Carolina at Chapel Hill and to connect students in the Research Triangle to innovative research and professional development opportunities in field of US-China relations. it has grown to host over 100 delegates from across the US and China.

In 2012, the Duke-UNC China Leadership Summit established a working relationship with Wuhan University and sponsored Wuhan students to attend the second annual Summit. The partnership arose out of Duke University's partnership with Wuhan University and the city of Kunshan on Duke Kunshan University (DKU). It was at the 2012 CLS that the managing director of DKU Nora Bynum announced that DKU programs will start in 2013, one year later than anticipated. CLS 2012 received sponsorship from the prestigious Kenan-Biddle Grant and was able to offer admission to non Duke and UNC Students.

Former Speakers 

 Dennis C. Blair, former U.S. Director of National Intelligence, former Commander in Chief of the U.S. Pacific Command, retired U.S. Navy admiral.
 Quan Jing, Minister of the Chinese Embassy in Washington, D.C., former Deputy Director-General of the Department of North American and Oceanian Affairs of the Chinese Ministry of Foreign Affairs.
 James Heller, Consul General of the Consulate General of the United States of America in Shanghai, China.
 Melissa J. Lan, Consul General of the Consulate General of the United States of America in Wuhan, China.
 Yanzhong Huang, Senior Fellow for Global Health at the Council on Foreign Relations.
 David Shambaugh, Professor of Political Science and International Affairs and the Director of the China Policy Program at George Washington University.
 Jenny Chan, Departmental Lecturer in the Sociology of China at Oxford University and Advisor to Students and Scholars Against Corporate Misbehavior (SACOM).
 Bonnie Glaser, Senior Adviser for Asia, Freeman Chair in China Studies and Senior Associate, Pacific Forum at CSIS.
 Denis Simon, former Executive Vice Chancellor at Duke Kunshan University.
 Taisu Zhang, Professor of Law at Yale Law School.
 Jonathan Woetzel, Director of the McKinsey Global Institute.
 Rachel Wasser, Cofounder of Teach for China.
 David Wertime, Cofounder of Tea Leaf Nation.
 Louisa Greve, Director of Global Advocacy for the Uyghur Human Rights Project.
 Aaron Friedberg, Professor of Politics and International Affairs at Princeton University.
 Dan Blumenthal, Director of Asian Studies at the American Enterprise Institute.
 Deborah Bräutigam, Professor of Comparative Politics and Director of the International Development Program (IDEV), and the China Africa Research Initiative (CARI) at Johns Hopkins University's School of Advanced International Studies (SAIS).
 David H. Shinn, Adjunct Professor of International Affairs at The George Washington University's Elliott School of International Affairs.
 Paul Haagen, Senior Associate Dean at the Duke Law School and former chair of Duke's China Faculty Council.
 Kaiser Kuo, Chinese American journalist and musician, Founder and Co-Host of Sinica Podcast.
 Emily Feng, NPR's Beijing correspondent.

Former Participating Institutions 

 Harvard University
 New York University Shanghai
 Yale University
 University of Southern California
 Liberty University
 Grinnell College
 University of Alabama
 Columbia University in the City of New York
 Davidson College
 Washington University in St. Louis
 Wellesley College
 Wright State University
 Guilford College
 University of Mississippi
 Princeton University

References

External links 
 The Duke-UNC China Leadership Summit Website

International conferences in the United States
Student exchange
Duke University
University of North Carolina at Chapel Hill
Annual events in North Carolina